This page provides supplementary chemical data on methane.

Material Safety Data Sheet  

The handling of this chemical may incur notable safety precautions.

Structure and properties

Thermodynamic properties

Vapor pressure of liquid

Table data obtained from CRC Handbook of Chemistry and Physics 44th ed. Annotation "(s)" indicates equilibrium temperature of vapor over solid. Otherwise temperature is equilibrium of vapor over liquid.  Note that these are all negative temperature values.

Spectral data

References

Cited sources

Chemical data pages
Methane
Chemical data pages cleanup